Doğantepe is a village in the Amasya District, Amasya Province, Turkey. Its population is 880 (2021). Before the 2013 reorganisation, it was a town (belde).

References

Villages in Amasya District